Cisse may refer to:
 Cisse (river), a river flowing into the Loire at Vouvray, France
 Cisse, Poland, a Polish village
 Cisse Cameron, American actress (Space Mutiny)
 Cisse, a snout moth genus nowadays considered a junior synonym of Herculia

Cissé may refer to
 Cissé, Vienne, a French commune
 Cissé (surname)